Martín Cortés may refer to:

 Martín Cortés de Albacar (1510–1582), Spanish cosmographer
 Martín Cortés (son of Malinche) (1523–?)
 Martín Cortés, 2nd Marqués del Valle de Oaxaca (1532–1589)
 Martín Miguel Cortés (born 1983), Argentine footballer